The 2000 Belgian Supercup was a football match between the winners of the previous season's Belgian First Division and Belgian Cup competitions. The match was contested by Cup winners Genk, and 1999–2000 Belgian First Division champions, Anderlecht on 5 August 2000 at the ground of the league winners Anderlecht, Het Kuipje. Prior to the game, the clubs agreed to allow more substitutions, leading to Anderlecht making six changes at halftime and seven in total during the game. Anderlecht won the match by three goals to one, winning its fifth Belgian Super Cup, while for Genk it marked the third loss in three years.

Details

See also
1999–2000 Belgian First Division
1999–2000 Belgian Cup

References

Belgian Super Cup, 2001
Belgian Supercup
R.S.C. Anderlecht matches
K.R.C. Genk matches
August 2000 sports events in Europe